Vaigasi Poranthachu is a 1990 Indian Tamil-language romantic drama film written and directed by Radha Bharathi in his debut. The film stars debutants Prashanth and Kaveri. It was released on 16 November 1990 and became a commercial success. The film was remade in Hindi as I Love You (1992) with Prashanth reprising his role.

Plot 

Kumaresan belongs to a poor Hindu family living with his mother Lakshmi and his grandmother. Kumaresan is a brilliant student but naughty at school. Along with his friends, he teases Ranjitha, the daughter of Pandidurai, the village head. A few months later, attracted by Kumaresan's wits and pranks, Ranjitha falls in love with him. Pandidurai becomes insane knowing his daughter's love affair. His henchmen lock Kumaresan up, in Pandidhurai's house and lash him with a whip. Not able to stand this savage treatment on Kumaresan Ranjitha swoons. Ranjitha's mother Parvathi helps her daughter to elope with Kumaresan. A massive hunt is launched by the village head & what happened to the young lovers is the rest of the story.

Cast 

Prashanth as Kumaresan
Kaveri (Dubbing voice by Kokila) as Ranjitha
Sulakshana as Lakshmi, Kumaresan's mother
Sangeetha as Ranjitha's mother
K. Prabhakaran as Pandidurai, Ranjitha's father
K. R. Vijaya as Parvathi, Pandidurai's first wife
Janagaraj as Chinnarasu
Charle as Teacher
Chinni Jayanth as Headmaster
Kumarimuthu as Vaiyapuri
Cochin Haneefa as Malaiyappan, Kumaresan's father

Soundtrack 
The soundtrack was composed by Deva, with lyrics written by Kalidasan. Deva composed all the songs in one day. The soundtrack became hugely popular and gave Deva a break as composer.

Reception 
C. R. K. of Kalki wrote that the film had all the typical cliches of Tamil cinema. Deva won the Tamil Nadu State Film Award for Best Music Director.

References

External links 
 
 

1990 directorial debut films
1990 films
1990 romantic drama films
1990s Tamil-language films
Films directed by Radha Bharathi
Films scored by Deva (composer)
Indian romantic drama films
Tamil films remade in other languages